Adolf Wiklund may refer to:

 Adolf Wiklund (musician) (1879–1950), Swedish composer and conductor
 Adolf Wiklund (biathlete) (1921–1970), Swedish biathlete